The 1961–62 Scottish League Cup was the sixteenth season of Scotland's second football knockout competition. The competition was won Rangers for a second successive season, who defeated in a replay Heart of Midlothian in the Final.

First round

Group 1

Group 2

Group 3

Group 4

Group 5

Group 6

Group 7

Group 8

Group 9

Supplementary Round

First Leg

Second Leg

Quarter-finals

First Leg

Second Leg

Semi-finals

Final

Replay

References

General

Specific

League Cup
Scottish League Cup seasons